TD Ameritrade Network is an over-the-top (OTT) broadcast channel streaming financial news and education content. It was launched on October 24, 2017, as a free service with four hours of live original programming. From the outset, expanded hours beyond 8:30 AM to 12:30 PM were envisioned. By February 2018, the network was airing from 7:00 AM to 4:00 PM from its Chicago headquarters. Investors can tune in for real-time business updates and growth forecasts delivered by CEOs, analysts and investors alongside veteran TD Ameritrade traders.

In November 2018, the TD Ameritrade Network announced Nicole Petallides, former Fox Business anchor and New York Stock Exchange floor reporter, would join the network as an on-air host corresponding from Nasdaq MarketSite in New York. Petallides joined a group of hosts including Oliver Renick, former Bloomberg Businessweek co-anchor, and a lineup of veteran traders from TD Ameritrade.

The TD Ameritrade Network also offers translated programming for investors in Hong Kong and Singapore.

Notes

External links
 

Business mass media in the United States
Streaming television in the United States
2017 introductions